The 1908 Carnegie Tech Tartans football team represented the Carnegie Institute of Technology—now known as Carnegie Mellon University—as an independent during the 1908 college football season. Led by William F. Knox in his first and only season as head coach, Carnegie Tech compiled a record of 3–7.

Schedule

References

Carnegie Tech
Carnegie Mellon Tartans football seasons
Carnegie Tech Tartans football